Kakka is a 1982 Indian Malayalam-language film, directed by P. N. Sundaram and produced by C. V. Hariharan. The film stars Rohini, Kakka Ravi, Raghuvaran and Adoor Bhasi The film has musical score by K. V. Mahadevan.

Cast

Rohini
Kakka Ravi
Raghuvaran
Adoor Bhasi
Sankaradi
V. D. Rajappan
Achankunju
Beena Bhaskaran
Jagannatha Varma
Kaduvakulam Antony
Kanakalatha
Kunchan
Mala Aravindan
Manakkad Ravi
Master Vimal
Punnapra Appachan
T. M. Abraham
Thodupuzha Vasanthi

Soundtrack
The music was composed by K. V. Mahadevan and the lyrics were written by P. Bhaskaran.

References

External links
 

1982 films
1980s Malayalam-language films
Films scored by K. V. Mahadevan